Frigga (minor planet designation: 77 Frigga) is a large, M-type, possibly metallic main-belt asteroid. It was discovered by the German-American astronomer C. H. F. Peters on November 12, 1862. The object is named after Frigg, the Norse goddess. The asteroid is orbiting the Sun with a period of 4.36 years and completes a rotation on its axis every nine hours.

Frigga has been studied by radar. The spectra of this asteroid displays a feature at a wavelength of 3 μm, indicating the presence of hydrated minerals on the surface. The near infrared spectrum is reddish and shows no spectral absorption features. Potential analogs of this spectrum include enstatite chondrites and nickel-iron meteorites.

Since 1999 there have been four stellar occultations by the asteroid.  The first three were single chord observations, and the fourth was a 3-chord observation, and a miss. The best fit ellipse measures 60.0x74.0 kilometres at PA -14degrees.

References

External links 
 Lightcurve plot of 77 Frigga, Palmer Divide Observatory, B. D. Warner (2012)
 Asteroid Lightcurve Database (LCDB), query form (info )
 Dictionary of Minor Planet Names, Google books
 Asteroids and comets rotation curves, CdR – Observatoire de Genève, Raoul Behrend
 Discovery Circumstances: Numbered Minor Planets (1)-(5000) – Minor Planet Center
 
 

Background asteroids
Frigga
Frigga
MU-type asteroids (Tholen)
Xe-type asteroids (SMASS)
18621112